Nicolae Bălcescu is a commune in Călărași County, Muntenia, Romania. It is composed of three villages: Fântâna Doamnei, Nicolae Bălcescu and Paicu.

As of 2007 the population of Nicolae Bălcescu is 1,581. It is named after Nicolae Bălcescu.

References

Communes in Călărași County
Localities in Muntenia